Crenston Buffonge (13 October 1974) is a Montserratian former footballer who played as a defender.

International career

Buffonge played for Montserrat in 2000 against the Dominican Republic in both legs of the qualifiers for the 2002 FIFA World Cup.

References

External links
 

1974 births
Living people
Montserratian footballers
Montserrat international footballers
Association football defenders